County of Carnarvon may refer to:
 Caernarfonshire, Wales, United Kingdom
 Carnarvon County, Western Australia
 County of Carnarvon (South Australia)